Victoire Wirix (1875–1938) was a Dutch artist.

Biography 
Wirix was born on 	28 June 1875 in Maastricht. She studied at the Rijksakademie van beeldende kunsten and the Internationaal schildersatelier. She was a member of the Arti et Amicitiae.

Wirix died on 8 February 1938 in 's-Graveland (now Wijdemeren).

Gallery

References

1875 births
1938 deaths
Artists from Maastricht
19th-century Dutch women artists
20th-century Dutch women artists